Oreste Perri (born 27 June 1951) is an Italian sprint canoeist (and later politician) who competed from the early 1970s to the early 1980s.

Biography
Perri was born in Castelverde, in the province of Cremona. He won six medals at the ICF Canoe Sprint World Championships with four golds (K-1 1000 m: 1975 (tied with Poland's Grzegorz Śledziewski, K-1 10000 m: 1974, 1975, 1977) and two bronzes (K-1 1000 m: 1974, 1977).

Perri also competed in three Summer Olympics, earning his best finish of fourth twice (1972: K-4 1000 m, 1976: K-1 1000 m). On 22 June 2009, Perri was sworn in as mayor of Cremona, Italy.

References

External links
 
 

1951 births
Living people
Sportspeople from the Province of Cremona
Canoeists at the 1972 Summer Olympics
Canoeists at the 1976 Summer Olympics
Canoeists at the 1980 Summer Olympics
Italian male canoeists
Olympic canoeists of Italy
ICF Canoe Sprint World Championships medalists in kayak
Mayors of Cremona
Canoeists of Marina Militare
20th-century Italian people